Elmer William Weingartner (August 13, 1918 – March 15, 2009) was a shortstop in Major League Baseball who played for the Cleveland Indians during the  season. He was born in Cleveland, Ohio.

In his one-season career, Weingartner was a .231 hitter (9-for-39) in 20 games, including one RBI, five runs, one double and a .302 on-base percentage without home runs or stolen bases.

Weingartner died in Elyria, Ohio, at age 90.

External links
 or Retrosheet

Cleveland Indians players
Major League Baseball shortstops
Baseball players from Cleveland
1918 births
2009 deaths
Nashville Vols players